Mitsuru Manaka (真中 満, born January 6, 1971, in Tochigi, Tochigi, Japan) is a former Nippon Professional Baseball outfielder. On October 8, 2014, he was named manager of the Tokyo Yakult Swallows, replacing Junji Ogawa.  Manaka had previously been managing the Swallows' farm team.

References

External links

1971 births
Living people
Baseball people from Tochigi Prefecture
Nihon University alumni
Japanese baseball players
Nippon Professional Baseball outfielders
Yakult Swallows players
Tokyo Yakult Swallows players
Managers of baseball teams in Japan
Tokyo Yakult Swallows managers